The 2012 Rally Sweden, officially 60th Uddeholm Swedish Rally, was the second round of the 2012 World Rally Championship (WRC) season. The rally took place between 9 and 12 February 2012.

Results

Event standings

*These teams do not score points in the SWRC championship.

Special stages

Power Stage
The "Power stage" was a  stage at the end of the rally, held near Hagfors.

References

External links
 The official website for the rally
 The official website of the World Rally Championship
 Results at eWRC.com

Sweden
Swedish Rally
Rally